MacGregor's bowerbird (Amblyornis macgregoriae) is a medium-sized, up to 26 cm long, olive brown bowerbird of New Guinea's mountain forests, roughly the size and shape of an American Robin or a Eurasian Blackbird. The male is adorned with an erectile orange yellow crest, that is partly hidden until shown in courtship display. The unadorned female is similar to the male, but without the crest. Superb mimics, they are known for imitating other birds, pigs, rushing water, and even human speech.

The polygamous male builds a tower-like "maypole-type" bower, an elaborate courtship structure, with a central pole of twigs surrounded by a dish of moss with raised walls approximately 1 meter in diameter. He decorates the twigs of the maypole with flowers, fruits, insects and other objects. The diet consists mainly of fruits and insects.

When a female comes in proximity to the bower, the male struts and calls, and opens his crest to display its full color. Hiding the crest except during sexual display is thought to minimize his vulnerability to predators.

Widespread and common throughout its range, MacGregor's bowerbird is evaluated as Least Concern on the IUCN Red List of Threatened Species.

MacGregor's bowerbird was named in dedication to ‘Lady Macgregor’, wife of Sir William McGregor, Administrator of British New Guinea during 1888–98. Sir William's surname was originally, and thus formally, McGregor but he adopted the spelling MacGregor while in New Guinea as his personal preference.

References

External links
 BirdLife Species Factsheet

MacGregor's bowerbird
Birds of New Guinea
MacGregor's bowerbird